Zoltan George Hajos (born Zoltán György Hajós; 3 March 1926 – 9 October 2022) was a Hungarian-American organic chemist. Originally an academic in his native Budapest, then an industrial chemist in the pharmaceutical industry, he is known for the Hajos–Parrish–Eder–Sauer–Wiechert reaction (originally named Hajos-Parrish reaction by Claude Agami in 1985).

Biography

Chemistry training

Hajos studied chemistry at the Technical University of Budapest (TU Budapest), in Hungary, completing an M.Sc. in 1947, and his doctoral work under Zoltan Csuros of the Institute of Organic Chemical Technology in 1950.

Early academic career
Hajos remained there until accepting a position as assistant professor in organic chemistry at the TU Budapest in 1948, where he stayed until 1957, With backlash following the 1956 Revolution in October, 1956, Hajos left TU Budapest and communist Hungary for the United States, where he took a position as a research associate in organic chemistry, a senior postdoctoral-level position, in the Department of Chemistry at Princeton University, beginning in 1957.

Second academic and pharmaceutical periods

Hajos accepted a chemistry position with the Pharmaceutical Research Institute of Hoffmann-La Roche, a pharmaceutical company, in Nutley, New Jersey, in 1960. He remained in that position until beginning a second phase of an academic career in 1970, first in the Chemistry Department of the University of Vermont (1972–1973), and thereafter on the Faculty of Pharmacy of the University of Toronto (1973–1974). Hajos returned to the pharmaceutical industry in 1975, proceeding through a series of positions at the Research Institute of Johnson & Johnson, until retiring in 1990.

Research

Hajos–Parrish–Eder–Sauer–Wiechert reaction, discovery and importance

In a recent review of the Hajos–Parrish–Eder–Sauer–Wiechert reaction as a name reaction, Daniel Zerong Wang describes it, and its synonyms, thus: Nobel Prize laureate in Chemistry 2021 Benjamin List, a leader in the modern field of organocatalysis, describes the importance of the discovery of the Hajos–Parrish–Eder–Sauer–Wiechert reaction thus:

Personal life and death
Hajos died in Budapest on 9 October 2022, at the age of 96.

Awards and recognition
Hajos received a Certificate of Merit, an Iron Award, from TU Budapest in May 2013, in recognition of 65 years of professional service.

Hajos received a Certificate of Merit, a Ruby Award, from TU Budapest in 2017, in recognition of 70 years of professional service. 

Hajos received a Certificate of Merit, a Platinum Award, from TU Budapest in 2022, in recognition of 75 years of professional service.

Selected publications

References 

1926 births
2022 deaths
Hungarian chemists
Hungarian emigrants to the United States
Scientists from Budapest